= Mampeza =

Stream in Kinshasa, Democratic Republic of the Congo

Coordinates: 4°19′41″S 15°15′13″E

Mampeza is a stream in Kinshasa, the Democratic Republic of the Congo.
